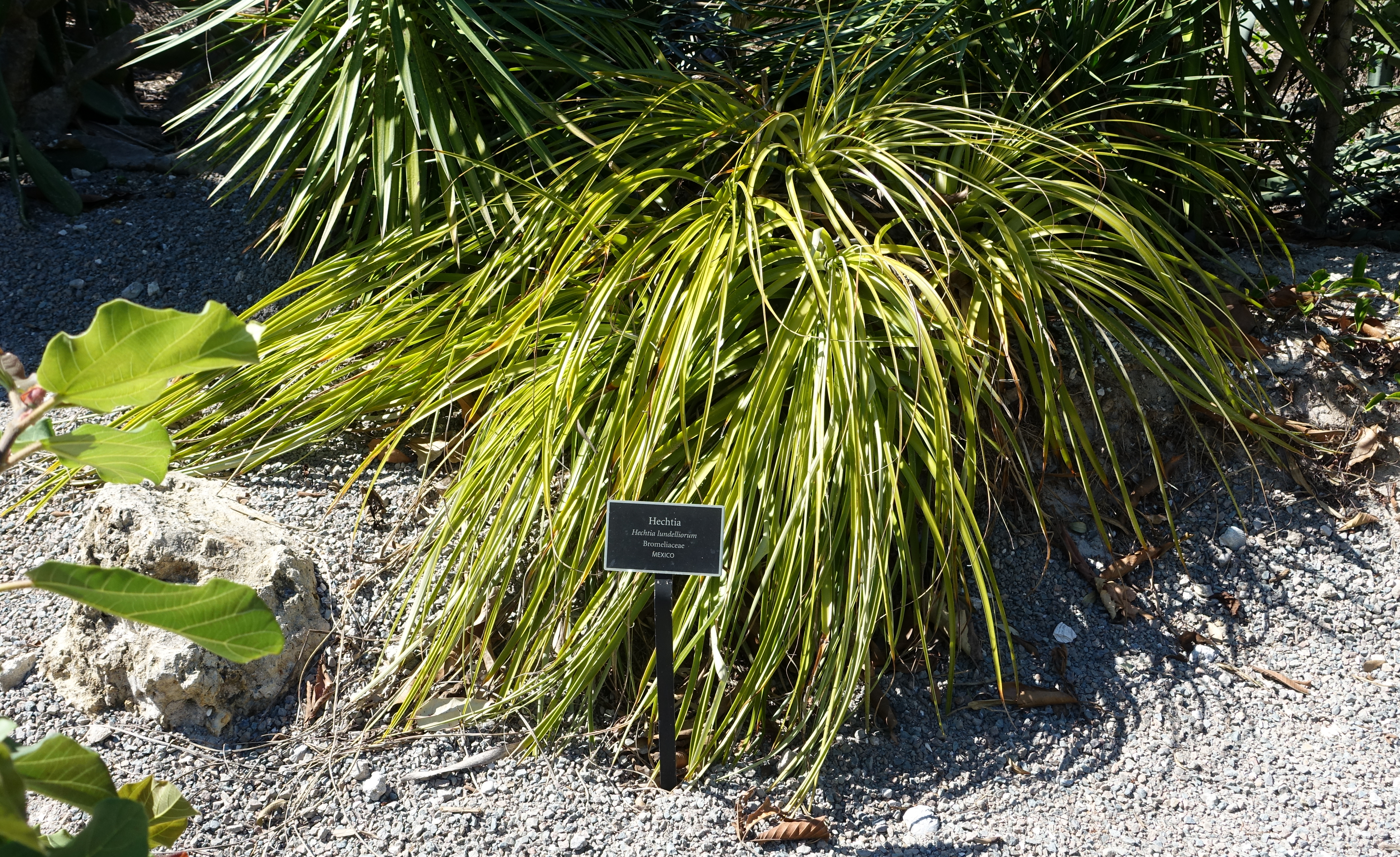

Scientific classification
- Kingdom: Plantae
- Clade: Tracheophytes
- Clade: Angiosperms
- Clade: Monocots
- Clade: Commelinids
- Order: Poales
- Family: Bromeliaceae
- Genus: Bakerantha
- Species: B. lundelliorum

Binomial name
- Bakerantha lundelliorum (Matuda) I.Ramírez & K.Romero

Synonyms
- Hechtia lundelliorum L.B.Sm.

= Bakerantha lundelliorum =

Species of flowering plant

Bakerantha lundelliorum is a species of plant in the family Bromeliaceae. It is endemic to Mexico.
